Alisa Kleybanova was the defending champion, but she lost to Michaëlla Krajicek in the second round.

Jelena Dokić claimed the title, defeating 5th seed Lucie Šafářová 2–6, 7–6(11–9), 6–4 in the final. Dokić won her first title in 9 years, sixth & the last title in her career.

Seeds

Qualifying

Draw

Finals

Top half

Bottom half

References
 Main Draw

Malaysian Open - Singles
2011 Singles